The 39th Royal Bavarian Reserve Division (39. Kgl. Bayerische Reserve-Division) was a reserve infantry division of the Imperial German Army in World War I. It was raised to division status on October 2, 1914, from an ad hoc unit, "Brigade von Rekowski", and named "Division von Rekowski" ("Rekowski's Division"). On December 8, 1914, it was renamed the 39th Reserve Division. As it was heavily made up of Bavarian units, on December 26, 1916, it was again renamed, this time as the 39th Royal Bavarian Reserve Division. It spent the war engaged in positional warfare in the Alsace-Lorraine region. It was dissolved in 1919 during the demobilization of the German Army after the Armistice.

Order of Battle on November 20, 1914 (Division von Rekowski):

1. bayerische Ersatz-Brigade:
Kgl. Bayerisches Ersatz-Infanterie-Regiment Nr. 1
Kgl. Bayerisches Ersatz-Infanterie-Regiment Nr. 3
9. bayerische Ersatz-Infanterie-Brigade:
Landwehr-Infanterie-Regiment Nr. 80
Landwehr-Infanterie-Regiment Nr. 81
3.Eskadron/Reserve-Husaren-Regiment Nr. 9
Kgl. Bayerische Feldartillerie-Ersatz-Abteilung Nr. 10
2.Batterie/Kgl. Bayerisches Feldartillerie-Ersatz-Abteilung Nr. 4
1.Batterie/Kgl. Bayerisches Feldartillerie-Ersatz-Abteilung Nr. 8
2.Ersatz-Kompanie/Kgl. Bayerisches 1. Pionier-Bataillon
1.Ersatz-Kompanie/Kgl. Bayerisches 3. Pionier-Bataillon

Order of Battle on February 20, 1918:

Kgl. Bayerische 1. Ersatz-Brigade:
Kgl. Bayerisches 1. Ersatz-Regiment
Kgl. Bayerisches 2. Ersatz-Regiment
Kgl. Bayerisches 5. Ersatz-Regiment
1.Eskadron/Kgl. Bayerisches 2. Chevaulegers-Regiment
Kgl. Bayerischer Artillerie-Kommandeur 21:
Kgl. Bayerisches 10. Reserve-Feldartillerie-Regiment
Stab Kgl. Bayerisches Pionier-Bataillon Nr. 23:
Kgl. Bayerische 21. Reserve-Pionier-Kompanie
Kgl. Bayerische 239. Minenwerfer-Kompanie
Kgl. Bayerischer 439. Divisions-Nachrichten-Kommandeur

References

 39. Bayerische Reserve-Division - Der erste Weltkrieg
 Histories of Two Hundred and Fifty-One Divisions of the German Army which Participated in the War (1914-1918), compiled from records of Intelligence section of the General Staff, American Expeditionary Forces, at General Headquarters, Chaumont, France 1919 (1920)
 Hermann Cron et al., Ruhmeshalle unserer alten Armee (Berlin, 1935)
 Hermann Cron, Geschichte des deutschen Heeres im Weltkriege 1914-1918 (Berlin, 1937)

Infantry divisions of Germany in World War I
Military units and formations established in 1914
Military units and formations of Bavaria
Military units and formations disestablished in 1919
1914 establishments in Germany